A Fingerling potato is a small, stubby, finger-shaped type of potato which may be any heritage potato cultivars. Fingerlings are varieties that naturally grow small and narrow. They are fully mature when harvested and are not to be confused with new potatoes. Popular fingerling potatoes include the yellow-skinned Russian Banana, the pink-skinned, yellow fleshed French Fingerling, the Purple Peruvian, and the Swedish Peanut Fingerling. Due to their size and greater expense compared to other potatoes, fingerlings are commonly either halved and roasted as a side dish or used in salads.

References

External links 
 
 

Potato cultivars